Brookesia stumpffi, also known as the plated leaf chameleon, is a species of chameleon found in some parts of Madagascar. It can be found in Nosy Bé, north-west Madagascar, Nosy Komba, and Nosy Sakatia.

Taxonomy
Brookesia stumpffi was originally described by Oskar Boettger, a German zoologist, in 1894.

Etymology
The specific name, stumpffi, is in honor of Anton Stumpff, who collected the holotype.

Geographic range and habitat
Glaw and Vences found B. stumpffi on small islands of Madagascar away from the main land mass of the country in 2007. The species can only be found in certain parts of Madagascar; it can be found in Nosy Be (sometimes known as Nosy Bé), north-western Madagascar, Nosy Komba, and Nosy Sakatia, and is common in the rainforest.

Conservation status
There are no known major threats to the Brookesia stumpffi, and the species seems to be adaptable to "disturbed habitats". The species is sometimes kept as a pet and domesticated. The species is marked as Least Concern by the International Union for Conservation of Nature.

Description

Reproduction

Diet
B. stumpffi feeds on insects such as crickets, fruit flies, cockroaches, wax moths (waxworms), and grasshoppers.

Biology

References

Further reading
Boettger O (1894). "Eine neue Brookesia (Chamaeleontidae) aus Nossibé ". Zoologischer Anzeiger 17: 182-185. (Brookesia stumpffi, new species). (in German).

stumpffi
Endemic fauna of Madagascar
Reptiles of Madagascar
Reptiles described in 1894
Taxa named by Oskar Boettger